Mandeville may refer to:

People
 Bernard Mandeville (1670–1733), Dutch-English philosopher, economist, and satirist
 Chris Mandeville (born 1965), American football defensive back
 De Mandeville, the surname of a Norman noble family
 Francis Mandeville (1850–1905), Irish nationalist politician
 Fred Mandeville (born 1922), Canadian politician
 Gay Mandeville (1894–1969), Bishop of Barbados
 Grace Mandeville (born 1994), British actress
 John Mandeville (priest) (1655–1725), Dean of Peterborough, England
 John Mandeville (14th century), compiler of The Travels of Sir John Mandeville
 Liam Mandeville (born 1997), English professional footballer
 Liz Mandeville, American musician
 Roger de Mandeville, 13th-century noble, son of Agatha
 William G. Mandeville (1807–1885), New York politician

Geoffrey de Mandeville descendants
 Geoffrey de Mandeville (11th century) (died 1100), Constable of the Tower of London
 William de Mandeville (died before 1130), Anglo-Norman baron and Constable of the Tower of London
 Geoffrey de Mandeville, 1st Earl of Essex (died 1144), during the reign of King Stephen of England
 Geoffrey de Mandeville, 2nd Earl of Essex (died 1166), second son of Geoffrey de Mandeville
 William de Mandeville, 3rd Earl of Essex (died 1189), loyal councillor of Henry II and Richard I of England
 Geoffrey FitzGeoffrey de Mandeville, 2nd Earl of Essex (second creation, 1191–1216), opponent of King John
 William FitzGeoffrey de Mandeville, 3rd Earl of Essex (second creation, died 1227)

Places

England 
 Hardington Mandeville, Somerset
 Keinton Mandeville, Somerset
 Norton Mandeville, Essex
 Stoke Mandeville, Buckinghamshire
 Sutton Mandeville, Wiltshire
 Thorpe Mandeville, Northamptonshire

United States 
 Mandeville, Arkansas
 Mandeville, Louisiana
 Mandeville, Missouri
 Mandeville, West Virginia
 Mandeville Island, California
 Mandeville site, archaeological site in Georgia

Elsewhere
 Mandeville, Eure, Normandy, France
 Mandeville-en-Bessin, Calvados, Normandy, France
 Mandeville, Jamaica
 Mandeville, New Zealand, in Southland
 Mandeville North, in Canterbury, New Zealand
 Mandeville, Quebec, Canada

Other uses
 Mandeville (novel) by William Godwin
 Mandeville Aerodrome, an airport at Mandeville, New Zealand
 Mandeville Films, American film production company
 Mandeville Sports Centre, a cricket ground in Ohoka, Canterbury, New Zealand
 Roman Catholic Diocese of Mandeville, Jamaica
 Wenlock and Mandeville, mascots for the London 2012 Summer Olympics
 Viscount Mandeville, a subsidiary title of the Duke of Manchester, England

See also 
 Mandeville School (disambiguation)
 Geoffrey de Mandeville (disambiguation)

English-language surnames
French-language surnames